UV-sensitive syndrome is a cutaneous condition inherited in an autosomal recessive fashion, characterized by photosensitivity and solar lentigines. Recent research identified that mutations of the KIAA1530 (UVSSA) gene as cause for the development of UV-sensitive syndrome. Furthermore, this protein was identified as a new player in the Transcription-coupled repair (TC-NER).

See also 
 Solar urticaria
 List of cutaneous conditions
 Cockayne syndrome
 Xeroderma pigmentosum
 Nucleotide excision repair

References

Further reading

External links

Skin conditions resulting from physical factors
Ultraviolet radiation
Syndromes